The Pavilion of Harmony (合一亭) is a well-renowned architectural feature at the New Asia College campus in Hong Kong, located between the student dormitories of the Xuesi and Zhi Xing buildings. The pavilion was constructed as a tribute to the founder of New Asia College, Mr. Qian Mu, and his philosophical work, "The Theory of Unity of Heaven and Man."

The Pavilion was completed in December 2003, donated by Ms. Ng Tsung Lin and designed by architect Professor Chan Wai Kei.。

The Theory of Unity of Heaven and Man is a central concept in Confucian philosophy, which holds that the way of humanity and the way of heaven are interconnected. The location of the Pavilion of Harmony is thoughtfully chosen, as described by the college's Dean, Professor Huang Nai Zheng, as "a clear pool, two trees half-embracing, not a traditional garden, but with modern artistic intent." The water feature in front of the pavilion further enhances the concept of unity between heaven and humanity.

The exterior walls of the pavilion feature calligraphy of Mr. Qian Mu's "The Theory of Unity of Heaven and Man" and the seal of "Unity of Heaven and Man," which were created by former Art Department professors Li Run Huan and Tang Jin Teng respectively.

There are bamboo trees planted next to the pavilion, and a stone bench under the pavilion overlooking Tolo Harbor, and a pond in front of the pavilion, which is crescent-shaped and extremely shallow, with a large tree in the middle of the pond. The pond is almost in line with the landscape of Tolo Harbor, creating the effect of unity between water and sky, promoting the idea of unity between heaven and man, while reflecting scenery and human figures. The beauty of the pool attracts many visitors, and there are even prospective couples taking wedding photos here. The first "Hong Kong Tertiary Student Photography Competition" was held in this location

References 

Ma Liu Shui
Chinese University of Hong Kong